Maria Margareta of Dietrichstein (Maria Margareta Josefa; 18 April 1637 – 15 December 1676), was a German noblewoman by birth, member of the House of Dietrichstein, and by marriage Princess Montecuccoli and Duchess of Melfi.

She was tenth child and sixth (but fifth surviving) daughter of Maximilian, 2nd Prince of Dietrichstein zu Nikolsburg, and his first wife Anna Maria, a daughter of Karl I, Prince of Liechtenstein and Duke of Troppau and Jägerndorf.

Life

In Vienna on 21 May 1657, Maria Margareta married with Raimondo Montecuccoli, an Italian military commander who also served as General for the Habsburg Monarchy, and for his services he received the titles of Prince of the Holy Roman Empire and Neapolitan Duke of Melfi. They had four children:

 Anna Carola Catarina Polissena (1658/59 – ?), married to Johann Jakob Bartholomäus Khiesl, Count of Gottschee zu Ganowitz, Kaltenbrunn, Schrattenberg und Weyer.
 Aloysia Luigia Anna (1660/61 – ?), married to Franz Anton, Count Berka von Dub und Leipa.
 Leopoldo Filippo (1662 – 6 January 1698), Prince of the Holy Roman Empire and Duke of Melfi; married on 1679 to Countess Maria Josepha Antonia of Colloredo. No issue.
 Faustina Barbara (25 May 1663 – 6 May 1703), married firstly on 17 January 1678, to Michael Wenzel Ungnad, Count of Weissenwolff, secondly in February 1680 to Franz Christoph II of Khevenhüller, Count of Frankenburg, and thirdly on 15 January 1688 to Wolfgang Andreas, Count of Orsini-Rosenberg.

Maria Margareta died in Vienna aged 39.

Notes

1637 births
1676 deaths
Dietrichstein family